San Pablo Huixtepec is a town and municipality in Oaxaca in south-western Mexico. The municipality covers an area of 17.86 km². 
It is part of the Zimatlán District in the west of the Valles Centrales Region

As of 2010, the municipality had a total population of 17,530.

References

Municipalities of Oaxaca